The 1976–77 South-West Indian Ocean cyclone season was a below-average cyclone season. The season officially ran from November 1, 1976, to April 30, 1977.

Systems

Moderate Tropical Storm Agathe

Severe Tropical Storm Brigitta

This system formed west of Diego Garcia on November 15.  For the next eleven days, Brigitta meandered southward as a tropical depression.  After assuming a westward course, Brigitta strengthened into a tropical storm on November 26.  The system reached its peak intensity as it passed by the northern tip of Madagascar.  The system moved through the Comoros Islands, and then turned southward into Mozambique.

Cyclone Clarence

On January 8, Clarence passed near St. Brandon, producing high waves that destroyed four boats and several homes. Wind gusts on the island reached . For several days moved in a counterclockwise track around the Mascarene Islands, producing high waves and beneficial rainfall on Réunion.

Moderate Tropical Storm Domitile

Severe Tropical Storm Emilie

Cyclone Emilie struck the east coast of Mozambique and northeastern South Africa in February 1977.  Heavy flooding in the Limpopo Valley killed at least 300 people.

Tropical Cyclone Fifi

Cyclone Fifi passed west of Réunion on February 6, bringing four days' of rainfall that reached . Flooding damaged crops and roads, and one person died while attempting to cross an inundated road.

Tropical Depression Gilda

Severe Tropical Storm Hervea

The storm passed just south of Agaléga, dropping  of rainfall.

Intense Tropical Cyclone Jack–Io

See also
Atlantic hurricane seasons: 1976, 1977
Eastern Pacific hurricane seasons: 1976, 1977
Western Pacific typhoon seasons: 1976, 1977
North Indian Ocean cyclone seasons: 1976, 1977

References

South-West Indian Ocean cyclone seasons
1976–77 Southern Hemisphere tropical cyclone season